Taphrina maculans is a fungal plant pathogen that is the causative agent of leaf blotch of turmeric plants. It has been reported from Bangladesh and India. The fungus was first described scientifically by Irish mycologist Edwin John Butler in 1911.

References

Fungi of Asia
Fungi described in 1911
Taphrinomycetes
Fungal plant pathogens and diseases